Tommy Keane (16 September 1968 – 28 December 2012) was an Irish professional footballer who played as a midfielder.

Early life
Keane was born in Dublin and raised in Galway.

Career
Keane played in England for Bournemouth and Colchester United, making a total of 19 appearances in the Football League

In October 1988 he returned to Ireland and was signed by manager John Herrick for Galway United, making his League of Ireland debut on 23 October 1988 at Cobh Ramblers. His first league goal came in Seamus McDonagh's first game as player manager in a 2–1 home win over Cork City on 27 November 

During the 1990-91 League of Ireland season he was Galway's top league scorer with 8 goals. He also scored in every round of the FAI Cup up to the final. On the biggest day in Galway's history he put in a Man of the Match performance as Galway United beat favourites Shamrock Rovers. He also played for Sligo Rovers, Finn Harps and Athlone Town.

His last League of Ireland goal came on 6 November 1994 when he came on as a substitute at the Brandywell Stadium on his season debut and scored a header with his first touch 
		 	
His last League of Ireland game was on 22 September 1995 as a substitute for Athlone against Cork City  Keane played for Galway in a friendly against Leicester City in July 1998.
		 
He scored a total of 37 goals in 114 appearances for Galway United in all competitions  He also represented Ireland at youth international level.

Death
Keane died on 28 December 2012 in Galway, after playing in an indoor soccer tournament.

Honours
 FAI Cup 
 Galway United – 1991

References

1968 births
2012 deaths
Republic of Ireland association footballers
Republic of Ireland expatriate association footballers
Republic of Ireland youth international footballers
Sportspeople from Galway (city)
Association footballers from County Galway
AFC Bournemouth players
Colchester United F.C. players
Galway United F.C. players
Sligo Rovers F.C. players
Finn Harps F.C. players
Athlone Town A.F.C. players
League of Ireland players
League of Ireland XI players
English Football League players
Association football midfielders